Parka decipiens is a Devonian fossil believed to be an early land plant, and is the only species described in the genus Parka.  It bears at least a passing resemblance to the alga Coleochaete, but the significance of this similarity is yet to be established.

Description
These discs contain a mass of what could be spores. Ultrastructural examination of these spores has shown that they lack the y-shaped trilete mark, a Y-like scar, that is characteristic of Silurian and Devonian pteridophytes.

References

Devonian plants
Charophyta